Animal identification using a means of marking is a process done to identify and track specific animals. It is done for a variety of reasons including verification of ownership, biosecurity control, and tracking for research or agricultural purposes.

History

Individual identification of animals by means of body markings has been practiced for over 3,800 years, as stated in Code of Hammurabi. The first official identification systems are documented as far as the 18th century. In Uruguay for instance maintained at that time a register of hot brands.

Methods

Birds
 Leg rings
 Wing tags
 Microchip implants (parrots)
 Telemetry (falconry birds)

Sheep
 Freeze branding
 Branding (hot-iron)
 Collar
 Earmarking
 Ear tags (non-electronic)
 Ear tags (electronic)
 Semi-permanent paint

Pigs
 Collars (electronic and non-electronic)
 Earmarking
 Ear tags (non-electronic)
 Ear tags (electronic)
 Semi-permanent paint
 Tattoo

Horses
 Collars (non-electronic)
 Branding (hot-iron)
 Branding (freeze)
 Microchip implants
Lip tattoo

Cattle
 Anklets
 Branding (freeze)
 Branding (hot-iron)
 Collars (electronic and non-electronic)
 Earmarking
 Ear tags (non-electronic)
 Ear tags (electronic)
 Rumen bolus (electronic)
 Cowbell

Dogs
 Collar
 Microchip implants
 Tattoo

Laboratory mice
 Earmarking (notching or punching)
 Ear tags (nickel, copper or scannable 2D barcode tags)
 Microchip implants
 Hair dye
 Toe clipping
 Manual tattoos (tail, foot pad or ears)
 Automated tail tattoos

Fish
 Microchip implants
 Fin clipping
 Coded wire tag
 Passive integrated transponder
 Acoustic tag
Visible implant elastomer (VIE)

Marine mammals
 Transponders
 Adhesive tags

Amphibians 

Microchip implants
 Toe clippings
Passive integrated transponder
 Visible implant elastomer (VIE)

Invertebrates
 Adhesive tags
 Semi-permanent paint

National animal identification schemes
 British Cattle Movement Service in Britain
 National Animal Identification and Tracing in New Zealand
 National Animal Identification System in the United States
 National Livestock Identification System in Australia

Footnotes

Gallery

References

 
Ethology